The 1995 Edmonton Eskimos finished in 2nd place in the North Division with a 13–5 record. They appeared in the North Final.

Offseason

CFL draft

Schedule

Regular season

Season standings

Season schedule

Total attendance: 283,274 
Average attendance: 31,475 (52.4%)

Awards and records

1995 CFL All-Stars
 DT – Bennie Goods
 LB – Willie Pless
 DB – Glenn Rogers Jr.

Northern All-Star selections

Offence 
 FB – Michael Soles, Edmonton Eskimos
 C – Rod Connop, Edmonton Eskimos

Defence 
 DT – Bennie Goods, Edmonton Eskimos
 LB – Willie Pless, Edmonton Eskimos
 DB – Glenn Rogers Jr., Edmonton Eskimos

Playoffs

North semi-final

North final

References

Edmonton Elks seasons
Edmonton Eskimos Season, 1995